Stare into Death and Be Still is the sixth studio album by New Zealand death metal band Ulcerate. The album was officially announced on 2 March 2020, and was released on 24 April 2020. This album is also the first to be released on Debemur Morti Productions.

Release
The album was first announced on 2 March 2020 with an announced date of 24 April of that same year, with the title track being released for purchase and streaming.

Critical reception

Jay Gorania of Blabbermouth called the album "dissonant and discombobulating" and that it "isn't an easy release to consume, but it's rewarding on the deepest and most profound levels for those who are patient enough to allow ULCERATE to work their magic." James Weaver of Distorted Sound Magazine praised the album as a "masterpiece of extremity" and "the strongest album the band have created and is one of the strongest albums to grace extreme metal this year." Langdon Hickman from Invisible Oranges praised the album for creating "deeply emotional core" and that the band were "very deliberate in their deployment of techniques from both technical death metal and post-metal." He concluded the article by stating the album was "a must-listen, not just for fans of the subgenre but fans of heavy metal in general."

Accolades

Track listing

Personnel
Paul Kelland – vocals, bass guitar
Michael Hoggard – guitars
Jamie Saint Merat – drums

References

2020 albums
Ulcerate albums